Yevgeni Konstantinovich Korablyov (born 29 October 1978) is a Russian former professional footballer.

External links
 

1978 births
Footballers from Moscow
Living people
Russian footballers
Association football midfielders
Association football defenders
Russia youth international footballers
Russia under-21 international footballers
Russian Premier League players
FC Dynamo Moscow players
FC Oryol players
FC Yenisey Krasnoyarsk players
FC Avangard Kursk players